Feig is a German surname. Notable people with the surname include:

Erik Feig, American film executive and producer 
Georg Feig (1899–1970), German Army officer
Herbert C. Feig (1886-1975), American businessman and politician
Paul S. Feig (born 1962), American film director, actor and author
, Israeli-German dancer
Elmer Feig (1897-1968), An American unlicensed architect

See also
Feigel
Feigl

German-language surnames
Jewish surnames